The 42nd Félix Awards were held on November 1, 2020 to honour achievements in Quebec music. The gala ceremony was hosted by Louis-José Houde, and televised by Ici Radio-Canada Télé.

Due to the COVID-19 pandemic in Canada, the ceremony was conducted under social distancing protocols; in his opening monologue, Houde joked that when he agreed to host the ceremony for the fifteenth time, he did not know that it would be "a PowerPoint at the Sheraton". Only nominees themselves were permitted in the theatre with no unnominated guests allowed, and were seated at tables spaced six feet apart; rather than winners coming up to the stage to accept their awards, the trophies were delivered directly to their tables by masked waiters.

Nominees and winners

References

Felix
Felix
Felix
Félix Awards